Catherine Karlsdotter, in Swedish called Katarina Karlsdotter and later Katarina Gumsehuvud (died 7 September 1450) was Queen of Sweden from 1448 to 1450 and Queen of Norway from 1449 to 1450 as the second wife of Charles VIII / I.

Biography
Catherine was the daughter of the nobleman Karl Ormsson (Gumsehuvud). She married the Regent (and then widower) Charles on 5 October 1438, when she became first lady and functioned as Queen in a ceremonial sense until 1440, when her husband was replaced as regent. Before their marriage, dispensation was obtained from the Pope, as Catherine was related to Charles's first wife. This was to ensure that children born in the marriage would be regarded as legitimate.

In 1448, her spouse became regent again and then was crowned King. She was crowned Queen of Sweden in Uppsala Cathedral on 2 July 1448. The next year, her husband became King of Norway also, making her Queen of Norway. The marriage is described as very happy and resulted in nine children. It was said that "Their relationship had always been of the best kind". Their second daughter, Magdalene, married Ivar Axelsson (Tott), an uncle of Ingeborg Tott.

Queen Catherine was described as beautiful and cheerful; she created a nice environment and a relaxed atmosphere at court, and she was forthcoming to those who came seeking audience.

In 1450, she became one of many who died of the plague in Stockholm, and was deeply mourned by the king. She was buried in 1451 in Vadstena Abbey.

Children
 Margaret Karlsdotter (Bonde) (1442–1462)
 Magdalen Karlsdotter (Bonde) (1445–1495), married to noble Ivar Axelsson (Tott) 1466
 Richeza Karlsdotter (Bonde) (born ca. 1445) nun at Vadstena Abbey.
 Bridget Karlsdotter (Bonde) (1446–1469) nun at Vadstena Abbey.
 four sons died early

References
 Wilhelmina stålberg: Anteqningar om svenska qvinnor (Notes on Swedish women) (Swedish)
 Åke Ohlmarks: Alla Sveriges drottningar (All the queens of Sweden) (Swedish)
 Lars O. Lagerqvist: Sveriges regenter - från forntid till nutid (The regents of Sweden - from then to now)
 Dick Harrison: Karl Knutsson

|-

Norwegian royal consorts
Catherine 1448
15th-century births
1450 deaths
Infectious disease deaths in Sweden
Burials at Vadstena Abbey
15th-century Swedish people
15th-century deaths from plague (disease)
15th-century Swedish women
15th-century Norwegian people
15th-century Norwegian women